Kiss it Goodbye was an American hardcore punk band from Seattle that formed in 1996 and broke-up in 1998.

History
After leaving the New Jersey band Deadguy in 1996, vocalist Tim Singer and guitarist Keith Huckins moved on to form Kiss it Goodbye with bassist Thom Rusnack and drummer Andrew Gormley. Huckins, Rusnack and Gormley were already familiar musically as they had all previously performed together in the New Jersey band Rorschach.

A demo tape titled Be Afraid was quickly recorded and heavily circulated around the New York City area which responded with high praise. The demo is the only recording made by the group to feature guitarist Eric Cooper. The band recorded their 1997 debut LP She Loves Me, She Loves Me Not for Revelation Records. Produced by Billy Anderson, the album had the same familiar sound that fans of Deadguy and Rorschach had come to know along with Singer's melodramatic screams and ramblings. The tracks "Preacher" and "Target Practice" which were omitted from She Loves Me, She Loves Me Not were also released this same year as a 7-inch EP through Revelation.

In 1997, the band toured with Unsane. They also toured with death metal outfit Obituary. After touring was completed, Huckins decided the touring and music were no longer to his liking and left the band. He was replaced by Seattle hardcore veteran and Kiss It Goodbye illustrator Demian "Headboy" Johnston. 
 
In 1998, the band recorded material for a Sub Pop Records EP that went unreleased due to Tim Singer leaving the band, ultimately leading to its breakup. The tracks were later released by Revelation Records as the Choke CD/7" EP.

The band briefly reunited in 2012 for a West Coast reunion tour. In coordination with the tour, Revelation Records re-released She Loves Me, She Loves Me Not on vinyl.

Band members
Andrew Gormley – drums (1996-1998)
Thom Rusnack – bass (1996-1998, 2012)
Tim Singer - vocals (1996-1998, 2012)
Keith Huckins – guitar (1996-1997)
Demian Johnston - guitar (1997-1998)
Eric Cooper - guitar (1996)

Discography
Studio albums
 She Loves Me, She Loves Me Not LP/CD (1997, Revelation Records)

Singles and EPs
 Be Afraid demo tape (1996, self-released)
 Preacher/Target Practice 7-inch (1997, Revelation Records)
 Choke 7-inch/CDEP (1999, Revelation Records)

References

External links
Kiss It Goodbye Biography On Revelation Records

Musical groups established in 1997
Musical groups disestablished in 1998
Hardcore punk groups from Washington (state)
Musical groups from Seattle
Revelation Records artists